The 2016–17 season was the 69th season of competitive football in Israel, and the 91st season under the Israeli Football Association, established in 1928, during the British Mandate.

Promotion and relegation

Pre–season

IFA competitions

League competitions

2016–17 Israeli Premier League

2016–17 Ligat Nashim

Cup competitions

2016–17 Israel State Cup

2016–17 Israeli Women's Cup

2016–17 Toto Cup Al

2016 Israel Super Cup

International Club Competitions

UEFA Champions League

Second qualifying round

Third qualifying round

Play-off round

UEFA Europa League

First qualifying round

Second qualifying round

Third qualifying round

Play-off round

Group stage

Group D

Group K

Round of 32

UEFA Women's Champions League

Group 6

UEFA Youth League

First round (Champions Path)

Second round (Champions Path)

Play-offs

National Teams

National team

2018 FIFA World Cup qualifying

2016–17 matches

Women's National Team

2017 Women's Euro qualification (group 8)

2019 Women's World Cup qualification (preliminary round)

2016–17 matches

U-21 National team

2017 European U-21 qualifying round (Group 4)

2016–17 matches

U-19 National team

2017 UEFA European Under-19 Championship qualification

Qualifying round

Elite round

2016–17 matches

U-19 Women's National team

2017 UEFA Women's Under-19 Championship qualification

Qualifying round

2016–17 matches

 In addition to these matches, the national team competed in the Women's League, finishing 7th, with 10 victories, 2 draws and 10 losses, scoring 43 goals and conceding 23 goals.

U-18 National team

2016–17 matches

U-17 National team

2017 UEFA European Under-17 Championship qualification

Qualifying round

Elite round

2016–17 matches

U-17 Women's National team

2017 UEFA Women's Under-17 Championship qualification

2016–17 results

U-16 National team

2016–17 results

U-16 Women's National team

2016–17 results

Notes

References

 
Seasons in Israeli football